A list of films produced in Singapore in 2011:

2011
Films
Singapore